Aivar Lillevere (born 23 January 1962) is an Estonian football manager and former football player.

Lillevere has managed Tulevik, Elva, and Estonian under-16, under-17, under-18, and under-19 national sides.

In February 2000, Lillevere managed the Estonia national team during the 2000 King's Cup.

On 21 May 2008, Lillevere was appointed manager of the Estonia women's national football team.

Honours

Manager
Tulevik
Esiliiga: 2016

Estonia Women
Women's Baltic Cup: 2008

References

External links

1962 births
Living people
People from Põltsamaa
Soviet footballers
Estonian footballers
Estonian football managers
Viljandi JK Tulevik managers
Estonia national football team managers
Association footballers not categorized by position